The 2007 Adelaide Sevens, promoted as the International Rugby Sevens Adelaide 2007, was a rugby sevens tournament that was part of the IRB Sevens World Series in the 2006–07 season. It was the Australian Sevens leg of the series, held over the weekend of 7 and 8 April at the Adelaide Oval in South Australia.

It was the first such tournament in Adelaide, and replaced the Singapore Sevens. The competition was won by Fiji who defeated Samoa 21–7 in the Cup final.

The tournament was the fourth completed edition of the Australian Sevens, with the event returning after a three-year absence following the 2003 Brisbane Sevens.

Format
The teams were drawn into four pools of four teams each. Each team played the other teams in their pool once, with 3 points awarded for a win, 2 points for a draw, and 1 point for a loss (no points awarded for a forfeit). The top two teams from each pool advanced to the Cup/Plate brackets. The bottom two teams from each group went on to the Bowl/Shield brackets.

Teams
The participating teams were:

Pool stage

Play on the first day of the tournament consisted of matches between teams in the same pool on a round robin basis. The following is a list of the recorded results.

Pool A

|width=10| 
|Results
 Fiji 33 - 7 Canada
 England 5 - 12 Tonga
 Fiji 22 - 21 Tonga
 England 31 - 12 Canada
 Canada 14 - 19 Tonga
 Fiji 12 - 20 England
|}

Pool B

|width=10| 
|Results
 South Africa 15 - 0 Kenya
 France 12 - 19 Japan
 South Africa 42 - 0 Japan
 France 33 - 24 Kenya
 Kenya 22 - 12 Japan
 South Africa 36 - 7 France
|}

Pool C

|width=10| 
|Results
 New Zealand 42 - 10 Wales
 Australia 46 - 0 Hong Kong
 Australia 24 - 15 Wales
 New Zealand 61 - 5 Hong Kong
 Wales 24 - 15 Hong Kong
 New Zealand 21 - 5 Australia
|}

Pool D

|width=10| 
|Results
 Samoa 26 - 10 Scotland 
 Argentina 19 - 17 Portugal
 Samoa 50 - 0 Portugal
 Argentina 19 - 24 Scotland
 Scotland 19 - 7 Portugal
 Samoa 19 - 7 Argentina
|}

Finals

Play on the second day of the tournament consisted of finals matches for the Shield, Bowl, Plate, and Cup competitions. The following is a list of the recorded results.

 1/4 final Bowl - Tonga 36 - 12 Japan
 1/4 final Bowl - Argentina 33 - 5 Hong Kong
 1/4 final Bowl - Wales 24 - 7 Portugal
 1/4 final Bowl - France 17 - 14 Canada
 1/4 final Cup - England 12 - 17 Kenya
 1/4 final Cup - Samoa 22 - 17 Australia
 1/4 final Cup - New Zealand 40 - 14 Scotland
 1/4 final Cup - South Africa 17 - 22 Fiji
 SF Shield - Japan 29 - 10 Hong Kong
 SF Shield - Portugal 12 - 14 Canada
 SF Bowl - Tonga 17 - 12 Argentina
 SF Bowl - Wales 19 - 14 France
 SF Plate - England 21 - 26 Australia
 SF Plate - Scotland 5 - 42 South Africa
 SF Cup - Kenya 0 - 31 Samoa
 SF Cup - New Zealand 17 - 24 Fiji
 Final Shield - Japan 17 - 43 Canada
 Final Bowl - Tonga 14 - 26 Wales
 Final Plate - Australia 31 - 0 South Africa
 Final Cup - Samoa 7 - 21 Fiji

Round 6 table

References

External links
 
 
 

Australian Sevens
Adelaide Sevens
Adelaide Sevens